The Sumathi Best Teledrama Art Director Award is presented annually in Sri Lanka by the Sumathi Group of Companies for the best Sri Lankan art director in television.

The award was first given in 1995. Following is a list of the winners since then.

References

Performing arts awards
Sumathi Awards